Eleodes osculans, the wooly darkling beetle or woolly ground beetle, is a common insect in coastal southern and central California in wooded areas or chaparral, and in Baja California. As a stink beetle of genus Eleodes, its easily observed defensive posture is to raise its hind end and secrete an unpleasant odor. E. osculans has a length of 12-16 mm and is the only known darkling beetle species with reddish-brown hair covering most of its black exoskeleton. It is similar to Eleodes nigropilosa and Eleodes littoralis, which have darker hair.

References

Further reading
 ; ; ;  (eds.) 2002: American beetles. Volume 2. Polyphaga: Scarabaeoidea through Curculionoidea. CRC Press LLC, Boca Raton, Florida. limited preview

External links

Tenebrionidae
Beetles of North America
Beetles described in 1851